Harbin Electric Company Limited, formerly Harbin Power Equipment Company Limited, is a Chinese enterprise engaged in the research and development, manufacturing and construction of power plant equipment. Along with Shanghai Electric and Dongfang Electric it is one of the three largest manufacturers of power plant equipment in China. According to Platts the company in 2009-10 was the second largest manufacturer of steam turbines by worldwide market share, tying Dongfang Electric and slightly behind Shanghai Electric.

History
In October 1994, the company was formed through the restructuring of Harbin Power Plant Equipment Corporation (currently Harbin Electric Corporation). It is headquartered in Harbin, Heilongjiang and listed on the Hong Kong Stock Exchange.

References

External links
Harbin Electric Group
Harbin Electric Company Limited

Electrical engineering companies of China
Engine manufacturers of China
Government-owned companies of China
Companies based in Harbin
Energy companies established in 1994
Manufacturing companies established in 1994
H shares
Companies listed on the Hong Kong Stock Exchange
Water turbine manufacturers
Chinese brands
Chinese companies established in 1994